Harlan is a home rule-class city in and the county seat of Harlan County, Kentucky, United States. The population was 1,745 at the 2010 census, down from 2,081 at the 2000 census.

Harlan is one of three Kentucky county seats to share its name with its county, the others being Greenup and Henderson.

History

Harlan was first settled by Samuel and Chloe Howard in 1796. Upon the founding of Harlan County (named for Kentucky pioneer Silas Harlan) in 1819, the Howards donated  of land to serve as the county seat. The community there was already known as "Mount Pleasant", apparently owing to a nearby Indian mound. A post office was established on September 19, 1828, but called "Harlan Court House" due to another Mt. Pleasant preempting that name. During the Civil War, Confederate raiders under Gen. Humphrey Marshall occupied the town; the local postmaster renamed the community "Spurlock" after himself; and, in October 1863, the courthouse was burnt down in reprisal for the Union destruction of the courthouse in Lee County, Virginia. In 1865, the post office was renamed "Harlan" and, although the community was formally incorporated by the state assembly as "Mount Pleasant" on April 15, 1884, the town was already usually called "Harlan Court House" or "Harlan Town" by its inhabitants. The city's terms of incorporation were amended to change the name to "Harlan" on March 13, 1912. One year before, the Louisville and Nashville Railroad had arrived in Harlan and prompted massive growth. The city had initially expanded east along the Clover Fork; after World War II, it also expanded south along Martin's Fork.

Harlan is the site of a criminal case in which a man, Condy Dabney, was convicted in 1924 of murdering a person who was later found alive.

A flood in 1977 prompted federal aid that diverted the Clover Fork into man-made tunnels under Ivy Hill in 1989. In the 1990s, a flood wall was completed on the city's west side along the four-lane bypass U.S. Route 421.

Geography

Harlan is located in west-central Harlan County at  (36.841487, -83.320066), at the junction of the Clover Fork and Martin's Fork rivers. The Clover Fork continues north  to join the Poor Fork, forming the Cumberland River, a major tributary of the Ohio River. Harlan is in a narrow mountain valley, constrained to the north by the western end of Black Mountain, to the south by Little Black Mountain, and to the west by Ewing Spur.

U.S. Route 421 passes through the city as four-lane highway; it leads north  to Hyden and southeast  to Pennington Gap, Virginia. The closest city with a population greater than 10,000 is Middlesboro, Kentucky,  to the southeast via U.S. Routes 119 and 25E.

Climate
The climate in this area is characterized by hot, humid summers and generally mild to cool winters.  According to the Köppen Climate Classification system, Harlan has a humid subtropical climate, abbreviated "Cfa" on climate maps.

Demographics

As of the census of 2000, there were 2,081 people, 926 households, and 550 families residing in the city. There were 1,060 housing units at an average density of 604.8 per square mile (2.339/km). The racial makeup of the city was 91.01% White, 7.02% Black or African American, 0.29% Native American, 0.86% Asian, and 0.82% from two or more races. Hispanics or Latinos of any race were 0.62% of the population.

There were 926 households, out of which 24.0% had children under the age of 18 living with them, 41.3% were married couples living together, 14.4% had a female householder with no husband present, and 40.6% were non-families. 39.0% of all households were made up of individuals, and 19.4% had someone living alone who was 65 years of age or older. The average household size was 2.17 and the average family size was 2.91.

In the city, the population was spread out, with 21.3% under the age of 18, 8.1% from 18 to 24, 25.8% from 25 to 44, 25.1% from 45 to 64, and 19.7% who were 65 years of age or older. The median age was 42 years. For every 100 females, there were 89.4 males. For every 100 females age 18 and over, there were 81.8 males.

The median income for a household in the city was $17,270, and the median income for a family was $29,135. Males had a median income of $37,500 versus $20,852 for females. The per capita income for the city was $15,572. About 23.8% of families and 32.4% of the population were below the poverty line, including 40.0% of those under age 18 and 20.6% of those age 65 or over.

Education

Two school districts, the Harlan County Public Schools and the Harlan Independent Schools, are based in the city. The independent schools, whose district roughly coincides with the city limits of Harlan, feature Harlan Elementary, Harlan Middle, and Harlan High.

Harlan County High School, which opened in 2008 as the consolidation of the county district's three previous high schools (James A. Cawood, Evarts, and Cumberland), serves all other public high school students in the county.  Harlan also features a campus of Southeast Kentucky Community and Technical College.

Harlan has a lending library, a branch of the Harlan County Public Library.

Media
The Harlan Daily Enterprise newspaper is published Monday through Saturday. Radio stations serving Harlan are WHLN (adult contemporary, 1410 AM), WFSR (gospel, 970 AM) and WTUK (country, 105.1 FM).

Some storylines of the FX Networks drama Justified take place in Harlan, although no scenes have been filmed there. The 2012–13 National Geographic series Kentucky Justice which followed the Harlan County Sheriff's Office in their daily duties was filmed in Harlan and Harlan County. Parts of the OxyContin scandal series “Dopesick” also take part in Harlan County. 

Harlan was also featured in the Darrell Scott song "You'll Never Leave Harlan Alive" (later performed by Brad Paisley, Patty Loveless and in 2019 by Montgomery Gentry on the CD "Outskirts"), the Steve Earle song "Harlan Man", the Anna McGarrigle song "Goin' Back to Harlan" (notably covered by Emmylou Harris), the song "Harlan County Line" from Dave Alvin, and the Tyler Childers song “Harlan Road”. 

Harlan County, USA is a documentary about the coal miners' strike against the Brookside Mine of the Eastover Mining Company in Harlan County in June 1973. Eastovers refusal to sign a contract (when the miners joined with the United Mine Workers of America) led to the strike, which lasted more than a year and included violent battles between company personnel and the picketing miners and their supportive women-folk. Director Barbara Kopple puts the strike into perspective by giving us some background on the historical plight of the miners and some history of the UMWA. It won an Oscar for Best Documentary in 1977. This is one of the reasons it is called "Bloody Harlan".

Notable people

 Maxine Cheshire, journalist
 Karl Spillman Forester, federal judge for the United States District Court for the Eastern District of Kentucky
 Edwin B. Howard, Chief of Intelligence of the Allied Land Forces in Central Europe
 Wallace Jones, NBA player
 James E. Keller, former justice of the Kentucky Supreme Court
 Nick Lachey, singer
 Cawood Ledford, University of Kentucky basketball and football announcer
 George Ella Lyon, author
 Jordan Smith, musician and winner of Season 9 of The Voice
 Green Wix Unthank, United States District Court judge
 Don Whitehead, two-time Pulitzer Prize-winning reporter and author

See also
 Harlan Commercial District
 Harlan Smokies, a minor league baseball team that operated here during 1948–1965

References

External links
 Darrell Scott, song: "You'll Never Leave Harlan Alive"

 

Cities in Harlan County, Kentucky
County seats in Kentucky
Populated places established in 1796
Cities in Kentucky
1796 establishments in Kentucky